Clifford Joseph Price MBE (born 19 September 1965), better known as Goldie, is a British music producer and DJ.

Initially gaining exposure for his work as a graffiti artist, Goldie became well known for his pioneering role as a musician in the 1990s UK jungle, drum and bass and breakbeat hardcore scenes. He released a variety of singles under the pseudonym Rufige Kru and co-founded the label Metalheadz. He later released several albums under his own name, including the 1995 album Timeless, which entered the UK charts at number 7.

Goldie's acting credits include the 1999 James Bond film The World Is Not Enough, Guy Ritchie's Snatch (2000) and the BBC soap opera EastEnders (2001–2002). He has also appeared in a number of celebrity reality television shows, including Celebrity Big Brother 2 (UK), Strictly Come Dancing, Come Dine with Me and Maestro.

Early life 
Born in Walsall, but raised in Wolverhampton England, Price is of Jamaican and Scottish heritage. He was put up for adoption at the age of three, and raised in childcare homes and by several foster parents. According to his 2002 autobiography, he was physically and sexually abused during this time. Price was a member of the breakdance crew Westside, based in the Whitmore Reans and Heath Town areas of Wolverhampton, in the 1980s. He later joined a breakdance crew called the Birmingham Bboys, and made his name as a graffiti artist in the West Midlands.

His artwork around Birmingham and Wolverhampton was featured heavily in Dick Fontaine's documentary Bombin. He is mentioned for his graffiti in the book Spraycan Art by Henry Chalfant and James Prigoff, which contains several examples of his art.

He moved to the United States owing to graffiti projects, and also started selling grills (gold teeth jewellery) in New York and Miami; he continued this business after his return to the UK in 1988. His nickname stems from "Goldielocks", an earlier nickname given to him during his Bboys days and subsequently shortened when he no longer wore dreadlocks.

Career

Music 
By 1991, Price had become fascinated by the British breakbeat music scene when his girlfriend, DJ Kemistry, introduced him to the pioneering jungle and drum and bass producers Dennis "Dego" McFarlane and Mark "Marc Mac" Clair, known as 4hero. He went on to execute some design and A&R work for 4hero's Reinforced Records label.

In 1992, Price made his first record appearance by contributing to an EP by Icelandic group Ajax Project that included the track Ruffige. For many years, the track was repeatedly misattributed to Price himself, perhaps because of his subsequent use of "Rufige" as moniker for his own releases.

His releases Killa Muffin b/w Krisp Biscuit and the Dark Rider EP were released under the alias "Rufige Cru" on Reinforced. His track "Terminator", released under the name "Metalheads" in 1992, was a hit in the jungle scene and is noted for pioneering the use of time stretching. In 1993, he released Angel, another 12" on the Synthetic Hardcore Phonography label. 1994 saw him setting up his own record label, Metalheadz.

His first studio album, Timeless, followed in 1995. Timeless entered the UK Albums Chart at number seven. The album fused the breakbeats and basslines common in jungle with orchestral textures and soul vocals by Diane Charlemagne. The album's title track was a 21-minute symphonic piece. "Inner City Life", a track from the album, reached number 39 in the UK Singles Chart. Timeless helped to popularise drum and bass as a form of musical expression. The music critic Simon Reynolds noted that Price's credentials as a musical innovator – and particularly as one of the key driving forces of innovation in the jungle/breakbeat scene – were exceptional. "Goldie revolutionised jungle not once but thrice", he noted in The Wire magazine, continuing, "First there was 'Terminator' (pioneering the use of time stretching), then 'Angel' (fusing Diane Charlemagne's live vocal with David Byrne/Brian Eno samples to prove that hardcore could be more 'conventionally' musical), now there's 'Timeless', a 22-minute hardcore symphony."

In 1996, he released the Toasted Both Sides Please remix of the Bush song "Swallowed", which topped charts in the US and Canada.

Price released his second album, Saturnz Return, in 1998. The album's opening track, "Mother", is an hour-long orchestral drum and bass piece. The album featured appearances by David Bowie, Noel Gallagher and KRS-One. The album met with mixed reviews. David Brown of Entertainment Weekly called the album "ambitious but monotonous and overlong – Pink Floyd with a gold tooth".

In 2002, Price said that he had been working for three years on a film called Sine Tempus, described as a coming-of-age story of a young paintbrush artist.  In 2006, he announced the soundtrack as his new album. The album was released via the Metalheadz website in 2008, but the film has not been released.

Price is known for his work as the leader of Rufige Kru. The group has no fixed members and has included drum and bass producers such as Technical Itch, Heist, Cujo, Agzilla Da Ice, Danny J, Doc Scott and Rob Playford.

March 2013 saw the release of The Alchemist: The Best of Goldie 1992–2012, featuring prominent tracks from throughout Price's musical career. A subsequent compilation, the three-CD Masterpiece set released by Ministry of Sound in 2014, brought together tracks that influenced him (Soul II Soul's "Back To Life", Roy Ayers' "Everybody Loves The Sunshine") with cuts that soundtracked his entry into the rave scene and key moments from the drum'n'bass scene.

In 2017, the Goldie album The Journey Man was released, which Price described as his "magnum opus" and "the most important thing that I've ever made."

In 2020, Goldie launched his new record label, Fallen Tree 1Hundred.

Acting 
Price has appeared in Guy Ritchie's Snatch and several other films, most notably the James Bond film, The World Is Not Enough. He also played gangster Angel Hudson in the British soap opera EastEnders (2001–2002). Price starred in Everybody Loves Sunshine (1999) (aka B.U.S.T.E.D. – United States title) with David Bowie.

Television appearances 
In the late 1980s, Price appeared on Central Weekend, a Friday evening topical debate show on Central TV, promoting graffiti as an art form. He had a small documentary made about his own art on Central TV's Here and Now programme featuring Pogus Caesar's photographs of New York. He has appeared on various young people's TV shows as part of a breakdance crew, the Bboys from Wolverhampton. In 1995, he appeared on Passengers, and in a Channel 4 documentary about himself in 1998.

His next TV appearance was hosting Crime Business on the digital TV channels Bravo and Ftn.  He presented the documentary series The World's Deadliest Gangs on Bravo in 2002.

Price appeared on the second series of Celebrity Big Brother in 2002. He was the first celebrity to be "evicted". In 2006, he was scheduled to appear in The Games, a UK reality TV show on Channel 4, but during training for the water-ski jump event he fractured his femur and was unable to take part in the show. He was replaced by Adam Rickitt. In 2009, he was reported to be suing the producers of the show for damages as a result of the injury.

During August and September 2008, the BBC broadcast Maestro, a reality television show in which eight celebrities, including Price, learned to conduct a concert orchestra. Price was placed second, behind Sue Perkins.

On 31 July 2009, the first of a two-part television programme Classic Goldie was broadcast, showing how in the wake of his success in the Maestro programme he learns to write a score for a large orchestra and choir. The resulting composition, commissioned by the BBC and entitled Sine Tempore (Timeless), was performed at two children's Promenade concerts in the Royal Albert Hall on 1 and 2 August 2009, which featured music connected with Charles Darwin and the creation and evolution of the world.

He appeared on Celebrity Mastermind on 27 December 2009 and came fourth behind Paul O'Grady, Gail Emms and Loyd Grossman. On 11 September 2010, he was announced as part of the line-up in Strictly Come Dancing, staying in the competition for two weeks.

On 22 December 2010, he appeared in a Celebrity Come Dine with Me Christmas special.

On 26 March 2011, he appeared in a three-part reality television series,  Goldie's Band: By Royal Appointment in which he led a group of music experts as they conducted a nationwide search for young talented musicians and then selected and coached 12 of them, who collaborated to create some musical pieces for a performance at Buckingham Palace.

On 24 August 2012, he appeared in the Channel 4 documentary Idris Elba's How Clubbing Changed the World (hosted by Idris Elba) to explain how he invented the revolutionary technique of time stretching by misusing an Ultra-Harmonizer, which is usually used for guitars. He then went on to say that when he crossed this with digital breakbeat, the sound evolved from jungle into drum and bass.

In 2014, he appeared on the telethon BBC Children in Need.

Art 
In 2007, Price returned to the art world with an art exhibition, "Love Over Gold", which was held at the Leonard Street Gallery, London. In 2008, he teamed up with Pete Tong to provide much of the artwork for Tong's new Wonderland club night at Eden nightclub in San Antonio, Ibiza.

There was an exhibition of Price's art in Berlin from 13 to 26 June 2008. In April 2009, a retrospective exhibition titled "Kids Are All Riot" took place in Shoreditch, London, coinciding with the release of his screenprint "Apocalypse Angel".

Around 2008, Price's art work was displayed on the London Underground by the arts company Art Below.

In 2021, he modeled for Louis Vuitton Menswear Spring/Summer and contributed a song.

Personal life 
In the early 1990s, Price had a relationship with drum and bass artist Kemistry, who died in a car accident in 1999. He was romantically involved with singer Björk in 1996.

In 1998, he bought a country house in Bovingdon, Hertfordshire. In 2002, Hodder & Stoughton published his autobiography, Nine Lives, which he wrote with Paul Gorman.

Price married model Sonjia Ashby in 2002. They divorced in 2005. As of 2003, he had five children, including social content creator Danny Price, who has appeared on Channel 4 reality show Make Me Prime Minister.

In 2007, Price began a relationship with Mika Wassenaar, a Canadian. The couple appeared in the 20 June 2009 episode of ITV's All Star Mr and Mrs with Phillip Schofield and Fern Britton. Mika and Price married in 2010.

On 29 April 2010, Price opened the William Tyndale Primary School Sports Pitch in Islington, London.

In July 2010, Price received an honorary doctorate in Social Sciences from Brunel University, Uxbridge. On 3 September 2010, he received an honorary degree of Doctor of Design from the University of Wolverhampton.

On 7 September 2010, Price's 23-year-old son Jamie Price was sentenced to life imprisonment, with a minimum sentence of 21 years, for murder. He was convicted of stabbing a rival gang member to death in Wolverhampton town centre on 24 August 2008.

As of 2017, Price and his wife were living in Thailand, having moved there in 2015.

Price was appointed a Member of the Order of the British Empire (MBE) in the 2016 New Year Honours awards, for services to music and young people.

Price was accused of assaulting a security guard at the 2017 Glastonbury festival after the guard had refused to let Price's daughter, Chance, backstage; Price later emailed a response which read, "Yep, guilty as charged", but in March 2018, district judge Lynn Matthews at Bristol Magistrates' Court rejected Price's emailed response and in a video call Price later admitted to assault by beating. On 30 May Bristol Magistrates' Court ordered Goldie to pay almost £2,500 as a fine.

In 2017, Price appeared to reveal the first name of pseudonymous graffiti artist Banksy as "Rob" on Scroobius Pip's weekly Distraction Pieces podcast. When discussing the rise of commercialism in street art, Price said, "Give me a bubble letter and put it on a T-shirt and write Banksy on it and we're sorted. We can sell it now... No disrespect to Rob, I think he is a brilliant artist. I think he has flipped the world of art over."

Discography

Albums 
Studio albums
 Timeless (1995)
 Saturnz Return (1998)
 The Journey Man (2017)

as Rufige Kru
 Malice in Wonderland (2007)
 Memoirs of an Afterlife (2009)

Soundtrack albums
 Sine Tempus – The Soundtrack (2008)

Collaboration albums
 Subject One – Music for Inanimate Objects (2019) with James Davidsen as Subjective
 The Start of No Regret (2022) with James Davidsen as Subjective

Selected singles/EPs 
 "Kris Biscuit / Killer Muffin" (as Rufige Cru) (Reinforced Records, 1992)
 Darkrider EP (as Rufige Cru) (Reinforced Records, 1992)
 Terminator EP (as Metal Heads) (Synthetic Hardcore Phonography, 1992)
 "Ghosts of My Life / Terminator 2" (as Rufige Kru) (Reinforced Records, 1993)
 "Angel / You and Me" (as Metal Heads) (Synthetic Hardcore Phonography, 1993)
 Internal Affairs EP (as Internal Affairs with 4hero) (Reinforced Records, 1993)
 "VIP Riders Ghost" (as Rufige Kru) (Metalheadz, 1993)
 "Inner City Life" (as Goldie presents Metalheadz) (FFRR, 1994) – UK No. 39 (UK Singles Chart)
 "Angel" (FFRR, 1995) – UK No. 41
 "Jah / Deadly Deep Subs" (Remixes) (Razors Edge, 1996)
 "State of Mind" (FFRR, 1996)
 "Digital" (featuring KRS-One) (FFRR, 1997) – UK No. 13
 "The Shadow" (as Rob & Goldie) (Moving Shadow, 1997) – UK No. 82
 "Kemistry V.I.P. / Your Sound" (Remixes) (Razors Edge, 1997)
 Ring of Saturn (FFRR, 1998)
 "Temper Temper" (feat. Noel Gallagher) (FFRR, 1998) – UK No. 13
 "Believe" (FFRR, 1998) – UK No. 36
 "Beachdrifta / Stormtrooper VIP" (Metalheadz, 2001)
 "Say You Love Me" (Metalheadz, 2005)
 "Monkey Boy / Special Request" (Metalheadz, 2007)
 "Vanilla" (Metalheadz, 2007)
 "Freedom" (featuring Natalie Duncan) (Metalheadz, 2012)
 "I Adore You" (2017)

Selected mixes 
 INCredible Sound of Drum'n'Bass (1999)
 Goldie.co.uk (2001)
 MDZ.04 (2004)
 Drum & Bass Arena: The Classics (2006)
 Watch the Ride (2008)
 FabricLive.58 (2011)

Filmography 
Everybody Loves Sunshine (1999) – Terry
The World Is Not Enough (1999) – Mr. Bullion
Snatch (2000) – Bad Boy Lincoln
The Price of Air (2000) – The Greaser
The Case (2002) – DJ Gabriel

Notes

References

Further reading 
Nine Lives, Goldie with Paul Gorman, Hodder & Stoughton, 2002.

External links 

 
 
 
 
 Goldie – biting through – Interview by Jan Goodey, November 2002
 The War is Over – Mixmag Interview by Tony Marcus, 1995
 Saturnz Return – Mixmag Interview by Matthew Collin about the release of his album Saturnz Return, 1997
 Goldie – Headz Will Roll Interview by Tim Colman
 Goldie – 2008 art exhibition

Living people
Black British artists
Black British male actors
Black British musicians
English DJs
English drum and bass musicians
English electronic musicians
English people of Jamaican descent
English people of Scottish descent
English record producers
Labour Party (UK) people
Members of the Order of the British Empire
Musicians from the West Midlands (county)
People from Walsall
1965 births
FFRR Records artists
Reinforced Records artists